Jim Svenøy (born 22 April 1972, in Fræna) is a retired Norwegian athlete who specialized in the 3000 metre steeplechase.

Competition record

External links

1972 births
Living people
People from Fræna
Norwegian male long-distance runners
Norwegian male steeplechase runners
Athletes (track and field) at the 1996 Summer Olympics
Athletes (track and field) at the 2000 Summer Olympics
Athletes (track and field) at the 2004 Summer Olympics
Olympic athletes of Norway
UTEP Miners men's track and field athletes
European Athletics Championships medalists
Norwegian expatriates in the Netherlands
Sportspeople from Møre og Romsdal